Jach'a Qullu (Aymara jach'a big, qullu mountain, "big mountain", also spelled Jachcha Khollo) is a  mountain in the Bolivian Andes. It is located in the La Paz Department, Loayza Province, Malla Municipality. Jach'a Qullu is situated south-west of the mountains Wila Willk'i, Malla Qullu and Janq'u Qalani (Jankho Khalani). It lies west of Malla. The river Jach'a K'uchu Jawira ("big corner river", Jachcha Khuchu Jahuira) flows along the northern slopes of Jach'a Qullu.

References 

Mountains of La Paz Department (Bolivia)